Sparano is a surname. Notable people with the surname include:

 Giuseppe Sparano (1709-1776), Italian cleric and polemicist
 Tony Sparano (1961–2018), American football coach
 Tony Sparano Jr. (born 1986), American football coach

Italian-language surnames